See also Bill Nichols (disambiguation).

Bill Nichols (born 1942) is an American film critic and theoretician best known for his pioneering work as founder of the contemporary study of documentary film. His 1991 book, Representing Reality: Issues and Concepts in Documentary, applied modern film theory to the study of documentary film for the first time. It has been followed by scores of books by others and by additional books and essays by Nichols. The first volume of his two-volume anthology Movies and Methods (1976, 1985) helped to establish film studies as an academic discipline. 
Nichols is Professor Emeritus in the Cinema Department at San Francisco State University and Chair of the Documentary Film Institute advisory board.

Nichols has lectured in numerous countries, served on film festival juries on different continents, consults regularly on a variety of filmmaking projects, and has published over 100 articles.

He is former president of the Society for Cinema and Media Studies, a former advisor to the American Film Institute and has served as Department Chair in Canada and the United States. Encyclopedia of the Documentary Film describes his place within film studies as "the most significant documentary scholar in the world". His early work shared with other film scholars a degree of difficulty as it tried to apply elaborate theories to popular films but, as with the field generally, the intensity of theoretical investigation diminishes in his later work as the emotional impact of specific works takes on greater importance. Not a film historian in the traditional sense, Nichols has offered fresh views of historical assumptions but his main contribution has been to offer a conceptual framework for the study and production of documentary film.

Writings
Author

Newsreel: Documentary Filmmaking on the American Left, New York : Arno Press, 1980.
Ideology and the Image: Social Representation in the Cinema and Other Media, Bloomington: Indiana University Press, 1981. 
Blurred Boundaries: Questions of Meaning in Contemporary Culture, Bloomington: Indiana University Press, 1994. 
Representing Reality: Issues and Concepts in Documentary, Bloomington:  Indiana University Press, 1991. 
Introduction to Documentary, 3rd edition. Bloomington, Ind.: Indiana University Press, 2017. 
Engaging Cinema: An Introduction to Film Studies. W. W. Norton & Company, 2010. 
The Cinema’s Alchemist: The Films of Péter Forgács (co-editor Michael Renov). University of Minnesota Press, 2011. 
Speaking Truths with Film: Evidence, Ethics, Politics in Documentary, University Of California Press, 2016  

Editor

Movies and Methods: An Anthology, University of California Press, 1985. Vol. 1 , Vol 2 
Maya Deren and the American Avant-Garde, University of California Press, 2001.

See also
Paul Rotha
Documentary mode

References

External links
 Bill Nichols Bio at personal page

Living people
21st-century American historians
21st-century American male writers
Film theorists
Documentary film people
1942 births
San Francisco State University faculty
American film critics
American male non-fiction writers
Presidents of the Society for Cinema and Media Studies